Tahar Aziz (born 19 November 1950) is a Moroccan boxer. He competed in the men's light flyweight event at the 1968 Summer Olympics. At the 1968 Summer Olympics, he defeated David Nata of Zambia, before losing to Hubert Skrzypczak of Poland.

References

1950 births
Living people
Moroccan male boxers
Olympic boxers of Morocco
Boxers at the 1968 Summer Olympics
Sportspeople from Casablanca
Light-flyweight boxers
20th-century Moroccan people